The Hongdu JL-10, also initially known as Hongdu L-15 Falcon, is a supersonic advanced jet trainer and light combat aircraft developed by Hongdu Aviation Industry Corporation (HAIC). It is used by the People's Liberation Army Air Force (PLAAF) as a lead-in fighter trainer (LIFT).

Development
China Aviation Industry Corporation II (AVIC II) was working toward a new advanced trainer for the People's Liberation Army (PLA) by 2000; that year AVIC II contracted the Yakovlev Design Bureau from Russia — and designer of the Yak-130 trainer — as a technical and scientific consultant for the L-15 programme. The L-15 would compete with the Guizhou JL-9 developed in parallel by China Aviation Industry Corporation I. The prototype was completed in September 2005 and first flew on March 13, 2006. The initial variants were a subsonic advanced jet trainer and a supersonic advanced fighter trainer.

Development of the L-15B, a supersonic variant for LIFT, was announced in 2010. It first flew on December 21, 2017.

The China National Aero-Technology Import & Export Corporation (CATIC) ordered 12 L-15 jet trainers in November 2012; it was not known whether these were for — or would be delivered to — a third-party.

The first L-15 in PLAAF colors was seen in 2016. The PLA used a few L-15s for flight-test evaluation before 2018. The People's Liberation Army Navy received 12 L-15s in August 2018. The PLAAF began using the JL-10 for LIFT in 2019. Compared to the less sophisticated JL-9, the JL-10 reduces candidate and conversion training time for more recent PLAAF aircraft.

On 23 February 2022, the United Arab Emirates announced its intention to buy 12 L-15s, with an option for 36 more. The value of the deal was not released, but The National (Abu Dhabi) reported that China sells the L-15 for $10–15 million per unit.

Design
The L-15 uses fly-by-wire (FBW) and a glass cockpit.

The prototypes were powered by Lotarev DV-2 turbofans.

The L-15A subsonic advanced jet trainer is powered by the Ivchenko-Progress AI-222-25 and has seven weapon hardpoints. The supersonic advanced fighter trainer variant is powered by the afterburning AI-222K-25. According to a Ukrainian source, 25% of the aircraft is composed of composite materials and its service life is 10,000 hours.

The L-15B light attack aircraft is powered by the AI-222K-25F for a maximum speed of Mach 1.4. Compared to the L-15A, the L-15B has shorter take-off and landing distances and two more hardpoints.

The L-15A and L-15B use a PESA radar.

Variants
L-15AW: Subsonic advanced jet trainer version with seven hardpoints. Previously marketed as L-15A.
L-15 advanced fighter trainer: Supersonic variant of the L-15A.
L-15Z: Designation of L-15 advanced fighter trainer in Zambian Air Force service.
L-15B: Supersonic light attack variant with nine hardpoints.
JL-10: PLAAF designation.

Operators

People's Liberation Army Air Force: 40+
People's Liberation Army Naval Air Force: 12

Zambian Air Force: 6

United Arab Emirates Air Force: 12-48 (projected)

Specifications (L-15B)

See also

References

External links

L-15 at Chinese Defence Today 
L15 Falcon Trainer Jet introduction - AirForceWorld.com  
First flight of L-15 03 (with pictures) 
News article on the maiden flight of the L-15 (with pictures) 
Incomplete recording of development history for L-15 (with pictures)  

2000s Chinese military trainer aircraft
Chinese military trainer aircraft
L-15
Twinjets
Aircraft first flown in 2006
Fourth-generation jet fighter